Kololo Senior Secondary School (Kololo SSS), is a government-aided, mixed, middle (S1 - S4) and high (S5 - S6), day school, in Kampala, Uganda.

Location
The school campus is located on Kololo Hill, in Kampala, Uganda's capital and largest city. Kololo SSS is bordered by  Lugogo Bypass to the east, Nviri Lane to the southeast, Malcolm X Avenue to the south, and Mackenzie Vale Road to the west and north. The coordinates of Kololo Senior Secondary School are:0° 20' 16.80"N, 32° 35' 52.80"E (Latitude:0.3380; Longitude:32.5980).

History
Prior to 1972, the student population was predominantly Indian. After the forced Asian exodus in 1972, the school population became predominantly African. Following the introduction of Universal Secondary Education, six hundred new students signed up for S1 in 2007, three times the usual number.

Academics
The school offers both Ordinary Level (S1-S4) subjects, as well as Advanced Level (S5-S6) subjects.

Notable alumni
 Jacob Oulanyah (1965–2022) - A Ugandan agricultural economist, lawyer and politician. He was the Deputy Speaker (2011-2021) and was also the Speaker of the Ugandan Parliament (2021-2022).
 Philly Lutaaya - The late Ugandan performing artist and AIDS activist attended Kololo Senior Secondary School, before dropping out in 1968.
 Rajat Neogy - Renowned Ugandan intellectual, poet and Founding Editor of Transition Magazine
 Professor Maggie Kigozi - Physician, sportswoman, businesswoman, entrepreneur. Former executive director, Uganda Investment Authority. Sits on the Boards of many of Uganda's public and private companies and organisations.
 Sudhir Ruparelia - Business magnate and entrepreneur. Chairman and majority shareholder in the companies of the Ruparelia Group. Wealthiest individual in the East African Community, with an estimated net worth of US$1.12 billion as of April 2015.
 Beatrice Rwakimari - public health leader, Woman MP for Ntungamo District

See also
 Kololo
 Education in Uganda
 Central Region, Uganda

References

External links
 Location of Kololo Senior Secondary School At Google Maps
 School Profile At School Guide Uganda
 About Mckenzie Ayato, A 17 Year Old Student At The School In 2006

Mixed schools in Uganda
Kampala District
Central Region, Uganda
Educational institutions with year of establishment missing